The Electronic Banking Internet Communication Standard (EBICS) is a German transmission protocol developed by the German Banking Industry Committee for sending payment information between banks over the Internet. It grew out of the earlier BCS-FTAM protocol that was developed in 1995, with the aim of being able to use Internet connections and TCP/IP. It is mandated for use by German banks and has also been adopted by France and Switzerland.

EBICS is used in the Single Euro Payments Area: the standard can be used as the secure communication channel to initiate SEPA Direct Debits and SEPA Credit Transfers using the Internet. SEPA concentrates on standardisation of clearing protocols in the inter-bank networks. The SEPA-Clearing guidelines do not supplant any national clearing transmission protocols. Theoretically the national banking transmission standards could be prolonged for decades.

History
In 2005, the German Zentraler Kreditausschuss (ZKA / Central Credit Committee) initiated a project to replace the national banking clearing system based on FTAM (short BCS-FTAM). The design goals were specifically set to create a transmission protocol that can be used by other countries as well.

On 1 January 2006, the new EBICS transmission protocol was included in the German DFÜ-Abkommen (EDI-Agreement - enacted first on 15 March 1995). Since 1 January 2008, all German banks must support the EBICS transmission protocol and support for BCS-FTAM ended on 31 December 2010.

On 14 November 2008, a cooperation with the French "Comité Français d’Organisation et de Normalisation Bancaire" (CFONB - standardisation office in the banking sector of France) was pronounced such that EBICS would be adopted for usage in France. On 5 May 2009, a joint committee was created to resolve a modified EBICS. On 12 February 2010, a common EBICS for Germany and France was published.

Most changes on the common EBICS involved to embed the French ETEBAC-3 message types and ETEBAC-5 signature elements into the EBICS transmission format. Previously ETEBAC was transported via X.25 packet network lines (in Germany the BCS-FTAM protocol used ISDN direct lines). French Telecom closed its X.25 network in November 2011.

The EBICS protocol is based on an IP network. It allows use of standard HTTP with TLS encryption (HTTPS) for transport of data elements. The routing data elements are encoded in XML and optionally signed and encrypted with X.509 PKI certificates (replacing older RSA keys). The EBICS transmission protocol can be used to wrap SEPA-XML statements as they come forward.

The standard does include two major areas – for usage in the bank-client transmission including statements of account (MT940/STA) and for interbanking clearing. The German Bundesbank has adopted the EBICS transmission protocol on 28 January 2009 to accept clearing information to be routed to the SWIFTnet interbanking network. The Bundesbank will only accept SEPA statements via SWIFTnet FileAct or EBICS submissions.

See also
 International Payments Framework
 ISO 20022

References

External links
 http://www.ebics.org - International website (English)
 http://www.ebics.de/ - German website
 Free EBICS testing Website, by Elcimaï Financial Software
 "Succession des protocoles ETEBAC", Marcel Roncin, President of CFONB, 17 November 2008 (French)
 EBICS Compendium
 PPI-EBICS-Blog
 free EBICS Client (French protocol v2.4)
 Epics - Open Source/LGPL EBICS client (protocol v2.5)

Online banking
Real-time gross settlement
Communications protocols
Payment interchange standards
Financial routing standards
Financial industry XML-based standards
Standards of Germany